The Mizoch (Mizocz) Ghetto (Cyrillic: Мизоч; Yiddish: מיזאָטש) was a World War II ghetto set up in the town of Mizoch, Western Ukraine by Nazi Germany for the forcible segregation and mistreatment of Jews.

Background 
Jews settled in Mizoch in the 18th century. In 1897, the total population of the town was 2,662 with 1,175 Jews owning factories for felt, oil and sugar production, as well as the flour mill and sawmills. Some Jews emigrated during World War I. According to the national census of 1921 in the Second Polish Republic there were 845 Jews in Mizocz, most of them identifying with the Turzysk Hasidism. Their numbers grew as the Polish economy improved. It was an urban community between world wars like many others in Kresy (eastern Poland), inhabited by Jews and Poles along with members of other minorities including Ukrainians. There was a military school in Mizocz for the officer cadets of the Battalion 11 of the Polish Army's First Brigade; the Karwicki Palace (built in 1790), Hotel Barmocha Fuksa, a Catholic and an Orthodox church, and a Synagogue. The nearest major city was Równo.

Before the German-Soviet invasion of Poland in 1939, the town, Mizocz, was located in the Wołyń Voivodeship in the Second Polish Republic. Annexed by the USSR following the 1939 Soviet invasion of eastern Poland, Mizocz was occupied by the Wehrmacht in Operation Barbarossa, the June 1941 invasion of the Soviet Union. Some 300 Jews escaped with the retreating Soviets.

Uprising and mass killings 
On 12 October 1942 the closed-off ghetto of about 1,700 Jews was surrounded by Ukrainian Auxiliary Police and German policemen in preparation for the ghetto liquidation action.  The Jews fought back in an uprising which may have lasted as long as two days. About half the residents were able to flee or hide during the confusion before the uprising was put down. On October 14, the inmates of the ghetto set many of the houses on fire; as a result, while many succeeded in escaping, about 200 people died in the flames inside the ghetto. On 14th and 15th October the captured survivors were transported in lorries to a secluded ravine and shot.

Photographs 

The shootings were photographed. The images owned by SS-Unterscharführer Schäfer until 1945 became part of the Ludwigsburg investigation (ZSt. II 204 AR 1218/70). They were published, and have become well known. Frequently the photographs are erroneously said to depict other Holocaust shootings.

Two of the photographs show the "Aktion" in progress.  The photographs give clear evidence of the execution practice common during the Holocaust by bullet in Reichskommissariat Ukraine. The victims were led to the killing place in groups of around five or so individuals, and forced to lie down among the prior victims, to be shot in the back of the neck or head, with a single bullet. Historians have commented upon the brutality shown in the Mizocz mass murder photographs:

The archival description of the entire set of photographs by the United States Holocaust Memorial Museum (USHMM) includes the following statements. Photograph #17876: "According to the Zentrale Stelle in Germany (Zst. II 204 AR 1218/70), these Jews were collected by the German Gendarmerie and Ukrainian Schutzmannschaft during the liquidation of the Mizocz ghetto, which held roughly 1,700 Jews." Photograph #17877: "Naked Jewish women, some of whom are holding infants, wait in a line before their execution by German Sipo and SD with the assistance of Ukrainian auxiliaries." Photograph #17878: "German police officer shoots Jewish women still alive after a mass execution (Zst. II 204 AR 1218/70)."
Photograph #17879: a "German policeman prepares to complete a mass execution by shooting two Jewish children."

Aftermath
Mizocz would later become the site of the OUN-UPA massacre of about 100 Poles by Ukrainian nationalists in late August 1943. Some 60 percent of the homes were set on fire and burned. Among the victims was Ukrainian carpenter Mr Zachmacz and his entire family, murdered along with the Poles because he refused to enter the fray. His eight-year-old son survived hiding with the Poles.

Following World War II, Poland's borders were redrawn and Mizoch was incorporated into the Ukrainian SSR. The Jewish community was never restored. After the dissolution of the Soviet Union, the town became part of independent Ukraine.

Notes

References

Further reading 
 Didi-Huberman, Georges, and Lillis, Shane B., Images in Spite of All: Four photographs from Auschwitz, Chicago : University of Chicago Press, 2008 
 Struk, Janina, Photographing the Holocaust: Interpretations of the evidence, London ; New York : I.B. Tauris, 2004 
 Spector, Shmuel,  The Jews of Volhynia and Their Reaction to Extermination, Published in Yad Vashem Studies 15 (1983)
 Desbois, Patrick, The Holocaust by Bullets, New York, Palgrave Macmillan, 2008

External links 
 
 Mizocz, Mizocz Ghetto and Sugar Refinery in Mizocz at Yad Vashem

The Holocaust in Ukraine
Einsatzgruppen
Jewish resistance during the Holocaust
Holocaust historiography
Eastern Front (World War II)
Ghettos in Nazi-occupied Europe
Holocaust locations in Ukraine